The following is the complete list of awards, honors and nominations received by American actor Jon Hamm.

Hamm is gained critical acclaim and awards attention for his leading role as Don Draper in the AMC drama series Mad Men (2008-2015). 
He received eight Primetime Emmy Award for Outstanding Lead Actor in a Drama Series nominations for the role. He finally won the award in 2015. He also received three nominations for Outstanding Guest Actor in a Comedy Series for 30 Rock. He also received six Golden Globe Award for Best Actor – Television Series Drama nominations winning twice in 2008 and in 2015. He was nominated for twelve Screen Actors Guild Awards winning twice along with the cast for Outstanding Ensemble in a Drama Series.

Major associations

Primetime Emmy Awards

Golden Globe Awards

Screen Actors Guild Awards

Miscellaneous awards

Annie Awards

Critics' Choice Awards

MTV Movie & TV Awards

National Board of Review Awards

Satellite Awards

Teen Choice Awards

Television Critics Association Awards

References

External links
 

Hamm, Jon